Derwin Gray may refer to:

Derwin Gray (defensive back) (born 1971), American football safety
Derwin Gray (offensive lineman) (born 1995), American football offensive tackle